A Taste of Blood is a 1967 American horror film, produced and directed by Herschell Gordon Lewis. It stars, among others, Bill Rogers and Elizabeth Wilkinson. The film was also known as The Secret of Dr. Alucard. Lewis considered it his masterpiece.

Plot 
A Miami businessman, John Stone, receives a parcel from England containing two old bottles of Slivovitz brandy from his recently deceased ancestor, and after drinking both bottles, becomes a vampire. Stone uses his newfound vampire powers to keep his wife, Helene, in a trance as he travels to England to kill the descendants of Abraham Van Helsing that murdered Count Dracula. Meanwhile, Helsing's distant relative, Howard Helsing, pursues Stone with the intent to put the reborn vampire to rest for good.

Cast 
 Bill Rogers as John Stone
 Elizabeth Wilkinson as Helene Stone
 William Kerwin as Dr. Hank Tyson (credited as Thomas Wood)
 Lawrence Tobim as Det. Crane
 Ted Schell as Lord Gold
 Otto Schlessinger as Dr. Howard Helsing
 Eleanor Vaill as Hester Avery
 Gail Janis as Vivian
 Herschell Gordon Lewis as The Limey Seaman and Voice of Baron Khron (credited as Seymour Sheldon)
 Judy Waterberry as Ida, the maid
 Dolores Carlos as Sherri Morris
 Roy Collodi as Delivery Man
 Karl Stoeber as Man Walking Dog
 Thomas Rowland as Detective
 Sidney J. Reich as Arthur Morris (credited as Sidney Jaye)
 Barrie Walton as Telephone Operator
 Cal Bowman as Hank's Golfing Friend
 Doug Weston as Police Photographer
 Jake R. Pawlson as Policeman
 Bill Kozak as Man Running From Tomb

References

External links 
 
 

1967 films
American supernatural horror films
1967 horror films
Films directed by Herschell Gordon Lewis
Dracula films
1960s English-language films
1960s American films